Ivana Habazin (born 22 October 1989) is a Croatian professional boxer. She is a former two-weight world champion, having held the IBF female welterweight title in 2014 and the IBO female middleweight title in 2018.

Early life
Habazin was born on 22 October 1989 in Zlatar, Croatia. A Catholic, Habazin wanted to enter a monastery at the age of 14, but later decided to pursue a career in boxing, which she began training at the age of 19. She was inspired to begin boxing by the movie Rocky.

She holds a master's degree in theology and attends the Dag Hammarskjöld college for a specialist degree in International Relations and Diplomacy.

Professional career
Habazin made her professional debut in June 2010, against Edit Szigeti, whom she defeated by a first round TKO. Habazin kept her undefeated record over her next nine fights, achieving stoppage victories against Emeke Halas, Ava Kovacs and twice against Daniela Bickei, as well as decision victories against Edita Karabeg twice, Marija Vuković and twice against Suzana Radovanović.

Her 10 fight winning streak earned her the chance to fight Eva Bajic for the vacant IBF female welterweight title. Bajic won the fight by unanimous decision.

Habazin rebounded from this loss with two decision victories, defeating Teodora Georgieva and Borislava Goranova. She once against challenged for the IBF female welterweight title against Sabrina Giuliani in March 2014. Habazin won the fight by split decision. She afterwards scheduled to defend her IBF title against Cecilia Brækhus, who was the defending WBO, WBA and WBC champion. Brækhus won the fight by unanimous decision.

She once again rebounded from this loss with two victories, a decision against Galina Gyumliyska and a first round stoppage of Dajana Bukva. These two victories gave Habazin the chance to fight Mikaela Laurén for the WBC female light middleweight title. Laurén won the fight by a third round TKO.

Following this loss, Habazin would win her next two fights, winning unanimous decisions against Valentina Stanković and Sanja Ristić. She was scheduled to fight Elene Sikmashvili for the vacant IBO female middleweight title. Habazin defeated Sikmashvili by a fifth round TKO. Habazin was scheduled to defend her IBO title six months later against Gifty Amanua Ankrah. Habazin won the fight by unanimous decision. Three months later, Habazin fought a rematch with Eva Bajic, winning the fight by unanimous decision.

Habazin was scheduled to defend her title for the second time against Claressa Shields in January 2020. This was the third time this fight was scheduled, with Shields pulling out the first time due to a knee injury, while the fight was cancelled the second time as Shields' brother Timothy Johnson assaulted Habazin's coach James Ali Bashir. Shields won the fight by unanimous decision.

She was scheduled to fight Layla McCarter in March 2021. Habazin was later rescheduled to fight Nana Chakhvashvili in April 2021 for the World Boxing Council Middle East Welterweight title. She won the fight by a second round TKO. Ms. McCarter also fought on the card.

Professional boxing record

See also
 List of female boxers

References 

1989 births
Living people
Croatian women boxers
People from Krapina-Zagorje County
Middleweight boxers